Bolivia is a unitary state consisting of nine departments. Departments are the primary subdivisions of Bolivia, and possess certain rights under the Constitution of Bolivia. Each department is represented in the Plurinational Legislative Assembly—a bicameral legislature consisting of the Senate and the Chamber of Deputies. Each department is represented by four Senators, while Deputies are awarded to each department in proportion to their total population.

Out of the nine departments, La Paz was originally the most populous, with 2,706,351 inhabitants as of 2012 but the far eastern department of Santa Cruz has since surpassed it by 2020; Santa Cruz also claims the title as the largest, encompassing . Pando is the least populated, with a population of 110,436. The smallest in area is Tarija, encompassing .

Departments

Former Departments

By population

Notes

See also

 ISO 3166-2:BO, the ISO codes for the departments of Bolivia.
 Bolivian autonomy referendums, 2008
 List of Bolivian departments by Human Development Index

References

External links

 National Bolivian Institute of Statistics

 
Bolivia
Subdivisions of Bolivia
Bolivia, Departments
Departments, Bolivia
Departments
Decentralization